FR2 may refer to:
 Forschungsreaktor 2, the first entirely German-built nuclear research reactor
 Fostex, Field Memory Recorder (FR-2)
 France 2, a French public TV network
 FR2 (Lazio regional railways), a rail network in the Rome area
 FR-2, synthetic resin bonded paper, often used in electronics
 FR2, a Japanese fashion brand owned by Ceno Company